Otter Lake is a lake in the province of Saskatchewan, Canada.  It is located 50 miles (80 km) north of La Ronge and is accessible from Highway 102. The lake is part of the Churchill River system. The Churchill River runs through the lake. It is approximately 10 miles long and 9 miles at its widest point.

Access 

The hamlet of Missinipe is located on the western shore of Otter Lake while Grandmother's Bay Indian Reserve is located on the north shore of the lake. The lake is on the north side of Lac La Ronge Provincial Park and one of the park's four RV parks is located on the east shore. Two of the streets in Missinipe are part of the RV park. Missinipe is the Woodland Cree name for the Churchill River.

Fish species 
Fish found in the lake include walleye, sauger, yellow perch, northern pike, lake trout, lake whitefish, cisco, burbot, white sucker and longnose sucker.

References

External links
Lac La Ronge Provincial Park

Lakes of Saskatchewan